The Department of Immigration and Multicultural Affairs (also called DIMA) was an Australian government department that existed between January 2006 and January 2007. It succeeded the Department of Immigration and Multicultural and Indigenous Affairs, which had been in place since 2001. It was the second so-named Australian Government department.

Scope
Information about the department's functions and/or government funding allocation could be found in the Administrative Arrangements Orders, the annual Portfolio Budget Statements, in the Department's annual reports and on the Department's website.

According to the Administrative Arrangements Order (AAO) made on 11 March 1996, the Department dealt with:
entry, stay and departure arrangements for non-citizens; 
border immigration control; 
arrangements for the settlement of migrants and humanitarian entrants, other than *migrant child education; 
citizenship; 
ethnic affairs; and
multicultural affairs.

Structure
The Department was an Australian Public Service department, staffed by officials who were responsible to the Minister for Immigration and Multicultural Affairs, Amanda Vanstone. The Secretary of the Department was Andrew Metcalfe.

Notes

References and further reading

Ministries established in 2006
Immigration and Multicultural Affairs
2006 establishments in Australia
2007 disestablishments in Australia
Multiculturalism in Australia